Classical and Quantum Gravity is a peer-reviewed journal that covers all aspects of gravitational physics and the theory of spacetime. 
Its scope includes:
Classical general relativity 
Applications of relativity 
Experimental gravitation 
Cosmology and the early universe 
Quantum gravity 
Supergravity, superstrings and supersymmetry 
Mathematical physics relevant to gravitation 
The editor-in-chief is Gabriela González at Louisiana State University. The 2018 impact factor is 3.487 according to Journal Citation Reports. As of October 2015, the journal publishes letters in addition to regular articles.

There was a companion website to the main journal, CQG+ which highlighted high quality papers published in the journal to raise the visibility of those papers. It also featured film reviews related to gravity such as Interstellar and The Theory of Everything .

Classical and Quantum Gravity also supports the field of gravitational physics through sponsorship of the British Gravity Meeting.

Abstracting and indexing
This journal is indexed in the following databases:
 
Science Citation Index Expanded
Current Contents / Physical, Chemical and Earth Sciences 
Scopus 
Inspec 
Chemical Abstracts Service 
INIS (International Nuclear Information System) 
Mathematical Reviews 
MathSciNet 
NASA Astrophysics Data System 
PASCAL Database
INSPIRE-HEP 
VINITI - Referativnyi Zhurnal
Zentralblatt MATH

References

External links
Classical and Quantum Gravity
CQG+ blog
IOP Publishing

Quantum mechanics journals
IOP Publishing academic journals
Publications established in 1984
English-language journals